Florence is a coastal city in Lane County, in the U.S. state of Oregon. It lies at the mouth of the Siuslaw River on the Pacific Ocean and about midway between Newport and Coos Bay along U.S. Route 101. As of the 2020 census, the city had a total population of 8,921.

History
The Florence area was originally inhabited by the Siuslaw tribe of Native Americans. Some claim that the city was named after state senator A. B. Florence, who represented Lane County from 1858 to 1860; another claim is that Florence was named after a French vessel that was wrecked at the mouth of the Siuslaw River on February 17, 1875.

Exploding whale
On November 12, 1970, Florence was the site of a famous scene, when town authorities used 20 cases of explosives to try to blow up a dead beached whale, with unintended consequences. In 2020 residents voted to name a new park Exploding Whale Memorial Park.

Geography and climate
Florence is located on the Oregon Coast at the mouth of the Siuslaw River immediately north of Oregon Dunes National Recreation Area, at about the same latitude as Eugene, Oregon. It is approximately midway between the other major central Oregon coastal cities of Newport and Coos Bay. Florence annexed Driftwood Shores hotel and conference center north of town in Heceta Beach in 2008.

Demographics

2010 census
As of the census of 2010, there were 8,466 people, 4,226 households, and 2,374 families living in the city. The racial makeup of the city was 92.5% White, Pacific Islander, 1.4%  1.3% Native American, 1.0% Asian, 0.3% African American,0.3%, Pacific Islander, 1.4% from other races, and 3.2% from two or more races. Hispanic or Latino of any race were 5.4% of the population.

There were 4,226 households, of which 15.8% had children under the age of 18 living with them, 43.7% were married couples living together, 9.2% had a female householder with no husband present, 3.3% had a male householder with no wife present, and 43.8% were non-families. 37.0% of all households were made up of individuals, and 21.9% had someone living alone who was 65 years of age or older. The average household size was 1.98 and the average family size was 2.51.

The median age in the city was 57 years. 13.9% of residents were under the age of 18; 5.9% were between the ages of 18 and 24; 15.5% were from 25 to 44; 28.4% were from 45 to 64; and 36.4% were 65 years of age or older. The gender makeup of the city was 46.4% male and 53.6% female.

2000 census

Per the census of 2000, there were 7,263 people, 3,564 households, and 2,145 families living in the city. The 2007 population estimate was 8,270. The population density was 1,476.3 people per square mile (570.0/km). There were 4,174 housing units at an average density of 848.4 per square mile (327.6/km). The racial makeup of the city was 95.88% White, 0.28% African American, 0.92% Native American, 0.55% Asian, 0.14% Pacific Islander, 0.56% from other races, and 1.67% from two or more races. 2.37% of the population were Hispanic or Latino of any race. There were 3,564 households, out of which 16.9% had children under the age of 18 living with them, 48.6% were married couples living together, 9.3% had a female householder with no husband present, and 39.8% were non-families. 34.4% of all households were made up of individuals, and 21.7% had someone living alone who was 65 years of age or older. The average household size was 2.02 and the average family size was 2.52.

 In the city, the population dispersal was 16.8% under the age of 18, 5.0% from 18 to 24, 16.0% from 25 to 44, 23.9% from 45 to 64, and 38.2% who were 65 years of age or older. The median age was 56 years. For every 100 females, there were 84.8 males. For every 100 females age 18 and over, there were 82.1 males. The median income for a household in the city was $30,505, and the median income for a family was $36,784. Males had a median income of $30,962 versus $23,878 for females. The per capita income for the city was $18,008. 14.4% of the population and 10.0% of families were below the poverty line. 25.9% of those under the age of 18 and 8.3% of those 65 and older were living below the poverty line.

Economy
The former mainstays of Florence's economy were logging, commercial fishing, and agriculture, but today tourism is increasingly significant. Some local businesses include Sand Master Park, Mo's Restaurants and Three Rivers Casino Resort, which is run by the Confederated Tribes of Coos, Lower Umpqua and Siuslaw Indians. The Port of Siuslaw promotes commercial fishing, shipping and tourism. About one-third of Florence's population consists of retirees.

Arts and culture

Annual cultural events
Florence has hosted the Rhododendron Festival annually since 1908.

Museums and other points of interest 
The Siuslaw Pioneer Museum is located in a historic 1905 schoolhouse.

Old Town Florence is located on the Siuslaw riverfront. The Port of Siuslaw marina is to the east, and the Art Deco 1936 Siuslaw River Bridge is to the west. The boardwalk promenade was built along the marina to improve the area. Many businesses are on US101 itself, which runs through the town, north to south.

North of Florence on U.S. Route 101 are the Sea Lion Caves, a tourist attraction that features a sea cave that is the year-round home of a population of Steller sea lions.

Historic buildings
Historic buildings on the National Register of Historic Places in the Florence area include the Edwin E. Benedict House, a deteriorating house on the Siuslaw River that is said to have been Ken Kesey's inspiration for the Stamper House in his novel Sometimes a Great Notion, Heceta Head Lighthouse and Keepers Quarters, Jessie M. Honeyman Memorial State Park Historic District, the Siuslaw River Bridge, and the William Kyle and Sons Building in Old Town.

Parks and recreation

There are several parks and other sites managed by the Oregon Parks and Recreation Department near Florence, including Darlingtonia State Natural Site and Heceta Head Lighthouse at Devil's Elbow to the north, and Jessie M. Honeyman Memorial State Park to the south. The Oregon Dunes National Recreation Area, managed as part of the Siuslaw National Forest, begins south of Florence.

Education
Florence is served by the three-school Siuslaw School District, which includes Siuslaw Elementary School, Siuslaw Middle School, and Siuslaw High School. Lane Community College has a center in Florence.

Media
The Siuslaw News is a weekly newspaper published in Florence. The Eugene newspaper, The Register-Guard, is also distributed in Florence.
KXCR, 90.7 FM, is a 501(c)(3), non-profit, non-commercial, community radio station.
Locally owned and operated radio stations KCST-FM and KCFM (AM) provide music, news, local and regional sports, and emergency public service programming 24 hours a day.
Radio translator K211BP rebroadcasts KRVM-FM from Eugene.
Non-profit organization West Lane Translator, Inc. maintains licenses and transmission facilities for five High Definition television translators, as well as 6 FM radio translators providing free over-the-air programming to the Florence area.

Transportation

Highways
U.S. Route 101
Oregon Route 126

Air
Florence Municipal Airport

Healthcare
Peace Harbor Hospital serves western Lane County. It is also one of the area's largest employers.

Sister city
Florence had one sister city:

 Yamagata, Japan - Yamagata-shi was established in 2003 by the merger of Ijira (Florence's former sister city), Takatomi, and Miyama.

See also
Kyllo v. United States, a Supreme Court case involving a Florence resident

References

External links

Entry for Florence in the Oregon Blue Book

Florence Travel Guide & Sandboarding 

Cities in Oregon
Populated coastal places in Oregon
Cities in Lane County, Oregon
Oregon Coast
Port cities in Oregon
1893 establishments in Oregon
Populated places established in 1893